Theodorella is a genus of ascidian tunicates in the family Styelidae.

Species within the genus Theodorella include:
 Theodorella arenosa Michaelsen, 1922 
 Theodorella stewartensis Michaelsen, 1922 
 Theodorella torus Michaelsen, 1922

References

Stolidobranchia
Tunicate genera